Erik Crone may refer to:

Erik Crone (actor) (1896–1971), Danish actor
Erik Crone (resistance member) (1919–1945), Danish resistance member executed in 1945
Erik Crone (film producer) (1946–2022), Danish film producer